The Alkyonides Gulf ( - Kolpos Alkyonidon) is a bay that connects with the Gulf of Corinth to the west.  The bay is approximately 20 to 25 km long and 20 km wide. It stretches from Aigosthena to Cape Trachilos from east to west and from Cape Trachilos to the peninsula of Perachora from north to south. Three regional units surround the gulf: Corinthia to the south, West Attica to the east and Boeotia to the north. Except for the Megaris Plain to the southeast, mountains surround the gulf. These mountains include the Geraneia to the south, Pateras to the east, Cithaeron to the northeast and Mount Helicon to the north.  Beaches include Mikra Strava, Strava, Mavrolimni, Kato Alepochori, Aigosthena, Alyki and Paralia Korinis.  The Alkyonides Islands, which are also known as Kala Nisia (literal translation: "Nice Islands"), lie in the western end. These islands include Daskalio, Prasonisi and Zoodochos Pigi. More islands, including Fonias and Makronisos lie to the extreme north. Kouveli, in the Domvrenas Bay, also lies in the north.

Bays by the gulf
Chinou Bay, south
Psatha Bay, southeast
Aigosthena Bay, east
Livadostras Bay, northeast
Domvraina Bay, northwest

Places by the gulf

Agia Sotira, south
Mavrolimni, southeast
Aigeirouses, southeast
Kato Alepochori, southeast
Aigosthena, east
Agios Vasileios, northeast
Alyki, north

References

Landforms of Boeotia
Bays of Greece
Gulf of Corinth
Landforms of Corinthia
Landforms of West Attica